Kathy Yaeji Lee (born August 6, 1993), known professionally as Yaeji, is an American singer, DJ, and producer based in Brooklyn, New York City. Her style blends elements of house music and hip hop with mellow, quiet vocals sung in both English and Korean.

Early life
Kathy Yaeji Lee was born August 6, 1993, in Flushing, Queens, as a single child in a Korean family. She moved from New York to Atlanta when she was 5, and then to South Korea in the third grade. While living in South Korea, Yaeji switched between different international schools on a yearly basis, leading her to find friends on the Internet, where she would first discover music. She also briefly attended school in Japan before moving back to Korea.

Yaeji eventually moved back to the United States to study conceptual art, East Asian studies, and graphic design at Carnegie Mellon University in Pittsburgh. She embraced DJing as a hobby while attending Carnegie Mellon, crediting the afterhours electronic music dance party Hot Mass with her "indoctrination into nightlife." Yaeji learned how to use Traktor and began DJing at house parties. She DJed for two years before learning Ableton, making her own music and debuting on Carnegie Mellon's college radio station WRCT. Yaeji graduated from Carnegie Mellon in 2015.

Career
After graduation, Yaeji moved back to New York City to get involved in the music scene and to DJ. Her first single, "New York '93", referring to her year of birth, was issued on the New York City label Godmode on February 29, 2016, followed by a cover of "Guap" by Australian DJ Mall Grab that May. She had previously uploaded songs to SoundCloud, although they were removed; this included "Areyouami", which was released when she was at college.

Her debut eponymous EP, including both prior singles, was released by Godmode on March 31, 2017.

She began to gain attention following her first Boiler Room session in May 2017, which involved a remix of Drake's single "Passionfruit". The song was later released officially on Godmode's Soundcloud page.

The first of several stand-alone singles, "Therapy" was issued in July 2017, followed by a two-track digital single, Remixes, Vol. 1, on August 1 and the "Last Breath" single on August 28.

The music video for the single "Drink I'm Sippin On" was released on 88rising's YouTube channel in October 2017, quickly gaining over 1 million views in two weeks.
 
On November 3, 2017, Yaeji released her second EP, EP2, to positive reviews and moderate commercial success. The video for "Raingurl" was released on November 16.

Yaeji was named to the BBC's Sound of 2018 longlist in November 2017. She also performed at the 2018 Coachella Festival.

In 2021, "Raingurl" made it into New York Times'''s T magazine Spotify playlist, "Right Here: Asian Women Artists in the West." She also performed at BRIC's Celebrate Brooklyn! music festival, where she was rushed by fans.

A year after her release of "What We Drew", and a year into the global COVID-19 pandemic, Yaeji released her first collaborative work with Korean Indie band front man Oh Hyuk of Hyukoh. The release consisted two tracks: "Year to Year" and "29". Despite being artists of different genres, both artists were able to rediscover the joy that they feel when creating music because of the collaboration.

Her debut album, With a Hammer'', is set to be released in April 2023.

Personal life 
Yaeji currently lives in Brooklyn.

Discography

Studio albums

Mixtapes

Extended plays

Singles

As featured artist

Remixes

Videos
"New York '93" (2016) 
"Guap" (2016)
"Noonside" (2017)
"Feel It Out" (2017) 
"Therapy" (2017)
"Last Breath" (2017)
"Drink I'm Sippin On" (2017) 
"Raingurl" (2017)
"One More" (2018)
"Waking Up Down" (2020)
"What We Drew " (2020)
"For Granted" (2023)

References

Further reading

External links
Official website

American electronic musicians
American house musicians
Musicians from Brooklyn
American musicians of Korean descent
Living people
American women in electronic music
1993 births
Carnegie Mellon University alumni
Carnegie Mellon University College of Fine Arts alumni
American women DJs
Electronic dance music DJs
American LGBT people of Asian descent
Lesbian musicians
21st-century American women singers
21st-century American singers